The Bedard House, at 207 Spruce St. in Thompson Falls, Montana, was built in 1912.  It was listed on the National Register of Historic Places in 1986.  It has also been known as Roys Residence.

It was built by Charles Wicksell and Ecton Brown.  It is "a good example of a large 'pattern book' Bungalow style house which flourished throughout the United States during the first two decades of the 20th century, and was commonly built on the west side of Thompson Falls in ca.1910."

References

Houses on the National Register of Historic Places in Montana
Houses completed in 1912
National Register of Historic Places in Sanders County, Montana
1912 establishments in Montana
Bungalow architecture in Montana
Thompson Falls, Montana